Ješetice is a municipality and village in Benešov District in the Central Bohemian Region of the Czech Republic. It has about 100 inhabitants.

Administrative parts
Villages and hamlets of Báňov, Hlaváčkova Lhota, Radíč and Řikov are administrative parts of Ješetice.

Gallery

References

Villages in Benešov District